The TEDx Music Project is a catalog of the best live music from TEDx events around the world. This initiative is independently organized by a group of TEDx licensees, not created by TED.

, the TEDx Music Project SoundCloud catalog contained over 600 tracks. New songs are released each Tuesday.

Overview
Talks and music performances at TEDx events are licensed creative commons. The TEDx Music Project consists of a SoundCloud library of music curated locally from hundreds of cities. The entire catalog is available to download for free.

In 2015, the TEDx Music Project announced a data visualization effort that creates an interactive map of the entire catalog. It was created using music attributes such as "energy" and "danceability" queried from Spotify's Echonest API. Metadata was then ported into Mappr to create the visualization.

The TEDx Music Project was founded by Amy L Robinson in 2012.

References

External links 
 
 

American music websites
Music Project